NA-186 Dera Ghazi Khan-II is a newly-created constituency for the National Assembly of Pakistan. It mainly comprises the town and Tehsil of Kot Chutta which was in the old constituency of NA-172 before the 2018 delimitations.

2018 general election 

General elections are scheduled to be held on 25 July 2018.

See also
NA-185 Dera Ghazi Khan-I
NA-187 Jampur

References 

Dera Ghazi Khan